Giacomo Mosele (born 30 July 1925) was an Italian cross-country skier who competed in the 1950s. He finished 34th in the 18 km event at the 1952 Winter Olympics in Oslo.

Further notable results:
 1952: 2nd, Italian men's championships of cross-country skiing, 18 km
 1954: 2nd, Italian men's championships of cross-country skiing, 50 km

External links
18 km Olympic cross country results: 1948-52

1925 births
Living people
Cross-country skiers at the 1952 Winter Olympics
Italian male cross-country skiers
Olympic cross-country skiers of Italy